Gaya Charan Dinkar is an Indian politician and a member of the Bahujan Samaj Party from the state of Uttar Pradesh.Dinkar is a member and Leader of the Opposition in the Sixteenth Legislative Assembly of Uttar Pradesh.

References

External links 
Uttar Pradesh Legislative Assembly

Members of the Uttar Pradesh Legislative Assembly
Living people
Bahujan Samaj Party politicians from Uttar Pradesh
Year of birth missing (living people)